Lars-Erik Skiöld (19 March 1952 – 21 May 2017) was a Swedish wrestler born in Malmö. He won an Olympic bronze medal in Greco-Roman wrestling in 1980. He also competed at the 1976 Olympics, placing fourth. He won a silver medal at the 1977 World Wrestling Championships. 

Skiöld died on 21 May 2017 at the age of 65.

References

External links

1952 births
2017 deaths
Sportspeople from Malmö
Olympic wrestlers of Sweden
Wrestlers at the 1976 Summer Olympics
Wrestlers at the 1980 Summer Olympics
Swedish male sport wrestlers
Olympic bronze medalists for Sweden
Olympic medalists in wrestling
Medalists at the 1980 Summer Olympics